Paola Andrea Ferrari Yegros (born 16 September 1985) is a Paraguayan basketball player. She currently plays for Stadium Casablanca in Spain's Liga Femenina de Baloncesto as a shooting guard.

Biography
Paola Ferrari began playing basketball at age 7 at the club Deportivo Internacional in her native Asunción.

She played her first South American Championship in Peru, in the cadet category, where she stood out as a top scorer of the tournament. She made her debut in the senior league of Paraguay at age 14, where she played for several teams (Deportivo Internacional, Deportivo San Jose, UAA). She had outstanding performances in the South American Championships at all levels, being proclaimed best player, top scorer, and best three-point shooter on several occasions.

After training in the United States in 2003 at Tomahawk High School in Wisconsin, Ferrari played for Union University of Tennessee in 2004. A year later, she played for the University of Quevedo, where the team reached the semifinals. That same season, at age 20, she decided to jump to Spain to play for Alumisan Pio XII of Santiago de Compostela in Liga Femenina 2. After a quick adjustment period, she finished the season as the second highest scorer of the category.  The following season she played for Joventut Mariana de Sóller in a bid for promotion, but they could not achieve it.

In 2007 she debuted in the Liga Femenina for Baloncesto Rivas, but a lack of minutes made her change teams in December and finish a great season with Burgos. In 2008, after a season with Estudiantes, Ferrari returned to Sóller, where she achieved great numbers over four seasons.

In 2012 she suffered a serious injury, a ruptured anterior cruciate ligament of the knee, which kept her off the court until January 2013, when she returned to play for CB Avenida in Spain, winning the Liga Femenina. She returned to Spain once again, for CB Avenida, where she won the Supercopa de España and the Copa de la Reina, completing all of the country's national titles. In 2015 Ferrari achieved this feat in her native country, winning the Metropolitan Trophy with Club Sol de América without losing a game, and being elected MVP. After signing for Stadium Casablanca of Zaragoza, she became the season's top scorer. In 2017 she returned to Stadium Casablanca.

Ferrari plays internationally as a selection of Paraguay.

Career

Club

International
 1999 South American Championship Sub-16 
 2000 South American Championship Sub-16 
 2001 South American Championship Sub-18
 2005 South American Championship seniors 
 2006 South American Championship seniors 
 2010 South American Championship seniors 
 2013 South American Championship seniors
 2017 AmeriCup seniors (pre-world)

Championships
 Liga Femenina de España (1): 2013
 Copa de la Reina (1): 2015
 Supercopa de España (1): 2014
  (1): 2011
 Liga de Brasil (1): 2014
 Liga Paulista de Brasil (1): 2014
 National Championship of Paraguay (6): 1998,2000, 2001, 2003, 2006, 2015, 2017

Awards
 Chosen best basketball player of Paraguay (2): 2014, 2015
 Chosen one of the two best athletes of the century by the National Sports Secretary of Paraguay (2015)
 Best South American scorer (4): 2005, 2006, 2010, 2013
 Top scorer of the Liga Femenina de España (1): 2016
 All-Liga Femenina de España Team (1): 2016
 All-AmeriCup Team: 2017
 Top scorer of AmeriCup with 87 points (2017)

References

External links
 
 Page at the Spanish Basketball Federation 
 Page at ProDep 
 Page at Muevete Basket

1985 births
Living people
Basketball players at the 2019 Pan American Games
Paraguayan women's basketball players
Paraguayan people of Italian descent
Paraguayan expatriate sportspeople in Spain
Sportspeople from Asunción
Shooting guards
Pan American Games competitors for Paraguay
Paraguayan expatriate sportspeople in Brazil